David Berglas  (born 30 July 1926) is a British magician and mentalist of German-Jewish descent. His secret technique of locating a particular card within a pack has been described as the Holy Grail of card magic. He was one of the first magicians to appear on UK television.

Early life
Berglas was educated in several different European countries. He is German-Jewish, and escaped to Britain from Nazi Germany, aged 11.

Keen to be part of the war, he discovered that the American Army was urgently looking for suitable recruits for an important role in the denazification of Germany. They had to have some previous military training and to be able to pass strict physical and mental tests. Most importantly they had to speak two languages besides English, one of which had to be fluent German. The required minimum age was 21. Berglas explained that he was only 19 but could meet all the other qualifications. He was accepted into the Intelligence Service of the US Army, serving an 'adventure filled' 18 months at the end of WWII. He then attended Bradford Technical College to study textiles with a view of joining his family business based in Wyke, a village in Bradford.

He first became interested in magic in 1947, through a chance meeting with magician Ken Brooke. Magic became an all-absorbing hobby for about five years, during which time he studied psychotherapy, specialising in medical hypnosis.

Career
In the 1950s, Berglas created what is now referred to as the "Holy Grail" of card magic, known as "The Berglas Effect", in which a magician appears to allow someone to freely name any playing card and freely select any position in a deck ("any card at any number"), and the specified card is found at the specified position in a random deck. The effect was first named "The Berglas Effect" by Jon Racherbaumer in his 1984 book At The Table.

In 1999 he established a non-profit organisation called the Foundation for Promoting the Art of Magic (FP-AM). The Foundation presents "The David Berglas International Magic Award" annually at the International Magic Convention in London. It was first awarded to the organisers of the convention, The MacMillan family, then in 2008 to Uri Geller (Israel), in 2009 to David Copperfield (USA), in 2010 to Juan Tamariz (Spain), in 2011 to Derren Brown (UK) in 2012 to Jeff McBride (USA), and in 2013 Lu Chen (Taiwan) was the recipient. In 2014 the award was given to Berglas himself. The Award Committee had led Berglas to believe that the award was being presented to Dynamo, who after receiving it used sleight-of-hand to change the engraved name on the award to Berglas' and present it to him instead.

The British Magical Society is the oldest magic club in the UK. It presents 'The David Berglas Trophy' annually (since 1988) to leading British magicians.

Film 
Berglas has been involved with films, acting as a creative consultant and technical advisor, including:

 The 1967 version of Casino Royale, with Orson Welles, Peter Sellers, David Niven and Woody Allen.
 Stanley Kubrick's Barry Lyndon with Ryan O'Neal in 1975
 Albert R. Broccoli's  Octopussy with Roger Moore in 1981
 George Lucas's Willow with Warwick Davis in 1988
 Tim Burton's Batman with Jack Nicholson in 1989

Radio 
Berglas conducted what he called "Nationwide Psychological Experiments", involving millions of listeners in their homes. This part of the show required listeners to write in to confirm their reaction. His weekly broadcasts included sensational stunts, including hanging a box over Regent Street, London for a whole week. It had been officially sealed by the Diplomatic Corps of the Admiralty and, when opened, it contained the passport of a randomly selected member of the studio audience, sitting in the Playhouse Theatre by the Embankment. The passport had disappeared just moments before. He appeared on sound radio, on and off, for about 17 years, and when commercial radio first started he had a regular phone-in programme, late at night on LBC (London Broadcasting Company), which started in 1973.

Television 
Berglas was one of the first magicians to appear on British television with his own show. Meet David Berglas in 1954. Other television series followed and were highly acclaimed in the Netherlands, Sweden, Norway and Germany. Commercial television started in the UK in September 1955 and the first ever series was presented by Berglas on Associated Rediffusion called Focus on Hocus. In the 1970s he presented a one-hour television special from Las Vegas and in the UK he presented his Channel 4 series The Mind of David Berglas (1985–1986) where he interviewed and entertained celebrity guests including Omar Sharif, Christopher Lee, Britt Ekland, Peter Cook, Graham Chapman and Max Bygraves.

Honours 
In 1967, after his popular Dutch television series 'OPUS 13', he was named "Television Personality of the Year", the first time it had ever been awarded to a foreign celebrity.
President of the International Brotherhood of Magicians (British Ring) 1976/1977.
He has appeared on the covers of leading magic magazines including The Linking Ring (1977), Abra (1992), Magic (1998), The Genii (2007), and The Magic Circular (1957, 1975, 1989, 1992, 1996, 2000, 2006).
In 1979 he was voted "King Rat" of the Grand Order of Water Rats, the world's leading show business charity organisation.
He is a past President of The Magic Circle (1989–1998)
The Magic Circle presented him with the coveted "Gold Medal" in the year 2000 (which at the time had only been presented six times before, since 1926). In 1995 he received The "Maskelyne Award" for outstanding contribution to British magic and in October 2011, received The Magic Circle's highest international award, The David Devant.
He has also been honoured internationally including the "Gold Plaque" in Sweden, 1980 and the prestigious gold "Grolla" in Italy, 2008.
The Academy of Magical Arts, Hollywood, awarded David with a "Special Fellowship" in 2000, and the "Masters Fellowship" in 2004.
In 2008 he was bestowed the "Griffin Award" and named "Grand Master of Mystery" by PSYCRETS (The British Society of Mystery Entertainers).
He was presented with a Lifetime Achievement Award at the Session Convention in Gloucester, January 2011
In 2014, he was awarded The International Magic Award, at the International Magic Convention, London
He was awarded an MBE in the 2019 New Year Honours List.

Books 
In 1967 he released his best-selling Dutch book David Berglas onthult...bijna alles (David Berglas reveals...nearly everything), published by H.J.W. Becht's Uitgeversmaatschappij N.V. and in 1988 A Question of Memory (with Guy Lyon Playfair), published by Jonathan Cape Ltd.. He has written a number of articles and lecture notes for the magical fraternity, including The David Berglas File No.1 (1976) and the now out of print The Mind and Magic of David Berglas – As Revealed to David Britland, 2002, published by Jim Steinmeyer through Hahne Publications.

In 2011 he released a book with Richard J. Kaufman entitled The Berglas Effects. This is the book named after his "Any Card at Any Number" plot. The book has a foreword by Juan Tamariz and an afterword by Max Maven, acontains 3 DVDs and also includes a pair of 3D glasses. In 2012 he provided both a contribution and foreword to the PSYCRETS book Liber Mentis. A mysterium of effects essays and routines, edited and authored by Steve Drury. That year, Berglas provided the foreword to Dunninger Knows, by Joe Atmore

References

External links

1926 births
Living people
Mentalists
English Jews
Members of the Order of the British Empire
German emigrants to the United Kingdom
Academy of Magical Arts Creative Fellowship winners
Academy of Magical Arts Masters Fellowship winners
Academy of Magical Arts Special Fellowship winners